Josefa Pla Marco (died 1870) was a Spanish photographer. She is, alongside Amalia López Cabrera, known as one of the first pioneer professional female photographers in Spain. She married the photographer Vicente Bernad Vela of Valencia in 1850, and managed his studio after his death.

References 

 VV. AA., Historia de la fotografía Valenciana, Valencia, Levante-EMV, 1990;
 Josefa Pla Marco | Real Academia de la Historia

1870 deaths
Spanish photographers
19th-century Spanish women
19th-century women photographers
Spanish women photographers
1830 births
Pioneers of photography